Smart Start may refer to:
 Smart Start (education), an American education program
 Smart Start, Inc., an American manufacturer of alcohol-monitoring technology
 Smart Start, a Kellogg's breakfast cereal